The 2002 San Jose Earthquakes season was the seventh season of the team's existence.

Squad

Current squad 
As of August 18, 2009.

Club

Management

Other information

Competitions

Major League Soccer

Matches 

(OT) = Overtime

MLS Cup Playoffs

U.S. Open Cup

CONCACAF Champions Cup

Source:

Standings 

Top eight teams with the highest points clinch play-off berth, regardless of conference.x = Playoff berthy = Conference Winner (Season)s = Supporters Shield/Conference winner (Season)				
Dallas Burn wins first tiebreaker vs. Colorado Rapids (head-to-head: 2-1-1)

Overall 

Source: MLSSoccer.com
Rules for classification: 1st points; 2nd head-to-head record; 3rd goal difference; 4th number of goals scored.
(SS) = MLS Supporters' Shield; (E1) = Eastern Conference champion; (W1) = Western Conference champion
Only applicable when the season is not finished:
(Q) = Qualified for the MLS Cup Playoffs, but not yet to the particular round indicated; (E) = Eliminated from playoff-contention.

 – Since Los Angeles Galaxy won MLS Cup 2002 and the Supporters' Shield, San Jose Earthquakes qualified for the CONCACAF Champions Cup by finishing as Supporters' Shield runners-up.
 – Since Kansas City Wizards, MetroStars, and D.C. United finished outside of the top seven in the league standings, they enter the U.S. Open Cup in the third round proper rather than fourth.

References

External links
San Jose Earthquakes season stats | sjearthquakes.com
San Jose Earthquakes Game Results | Soccerstats.us
San Jose Earthquakes 100 Greatest Goals 2002 | Youtube

2002
San Jose Earthquakes
San Jose Earthquakes
San Jose Earthquakes